Clarkeulia radicana is a species of moth of the family Tortricidae. It is found in Colombia, Ecuador (Pichincha Province) and Peru.

The wingspan is 17.5 mm. The ground colour of the forewings is cream ochreous, with brownish suffusions. The dots and strigulae (fine streaks) are brownish and there is a cream blotch at the base of the wing. The hindwings are cream, tinged with pale ferruginous, especially in the apical portion.

References

Moths described in 1877
Clarkeulia